The 2020 NC State Wolfpack women's soccer team represented NC State University during the 2020 NCAA Division I women's soccer season. The Wolfpack were led by head coach Tim Santoro, in his ninth season. They played home games at Dail Soccer Field. This was the team's 37th season playing organized women's college soccer and their 34th playing in the Atlantic Coast Conference.

Due to the COVID-19 pandemic, the ACC played a reduced schedule in 2020 and the NCAA Tournament was postponed to 2021. The ACC did not play a spring league schedule, but did allow teams to play non-conference games that would count toward their 2020 record in the lead up to the NCAA Tournament.

The Wolfpack did not play in the fall season. However, they did resume play for the spring non-conference season.

The Wolfpack finished the spring season 5–3–1 and did not receive an at-large invitation to the NCAA Tournament. Their non-invitation broke a four-year streak of being invited to the tournament.

Previous season 

The Wolfpack finished the season 12–7–4, 4–2–4 in ACC play to finish in fifth place. As the fifth seed in the ACC Tournament, they defeated Louisville in the Quarterfinals before falling to eventual champions North Carolina in the Semifinals. They received an at-large bid to the NCAA Tournament where they defeated Navy and Arkansas before losing to BYU in the Round of 16.

Squad

Roster

Updated March 12, 2021

Team Management

Source:

Schedule

Source:

|-
!colspan=6 style=""| Spring Regular season

Rankings

Fall 2020

Spring 2021

References

NC State
NC State Wolfpack women's soccer seasons
2020 in sports in North Carolina